Bo-Day-Shus!!! is the third album by Mojo Nixon and Skid Roper, released in 1987. It contains the song "Elvis is Everywhere," which became an MTV hit.

The album peaked at #189 on the Billboard 200.

Production
Skid Roper wrote and sang two songs on the album, "The Polka Polka" and "Lincoln Logs."

Critical reception
Kiernan McCarthy of AllMusic praised the album's humor, writing that "not every joke Mojo Nixon lets fly on Bo-Day-Shus!!! is a knee-slapper, but one cannot deny his persistence. If you don't like the first quip, he might catch you on the second one, or the tenth." He specifically referred to "Elvis is Everywhere" and "I Ain't Gonna Piss In No Jar" as the best examples of this. Robert Christgau also appreciated "Elvis is Everywhere," comparing it to the music of Phil Ochs, but was critical of several of the other tracks, especially Roper's contribution "Lincoln Logs."  Trouser Press called the album "a hoot," and praised the "epic" "Elvis is Everywhere." The Rough Guide to Rock called it "shambling and sweet-tempered."

In a retrospective review, PopMatters wrote: "Two decades later, Bo-Day-Shus!!! stands as the ultimate musical document of America's '80s love affair with redneck culture."

Track listing
All songs written by Mojo Nixon and published by Tallywacker Tunes/La Rana Music except as indicated.
 "Elvis Is Everywhere"
 "We Gotta Have More Soul!"
 "I Ain't Gonna Piss In No Jar"
 "The Polka Polka" (Skid Roper)
 "I'm Gonna Dig Up Howlin' Wolf"
 "The Story Of One Chord" [*]
 "Gin Guzzlin' Frenzy"
 "B.B.Q. U.S.A."
 "Positively Bodies Parking Lot"
 "Wash No Dishes No More"
 "Lincoln Logs" (Skid Roper)
 "Wide Open"
 "Don't Want No Foo-Foo Haircut On My Head" [*]
[*] Bonus tracks on CD and cassette releases.

Personnel
 The Dinkleberry Singers:
Country Dick Montana
David Farage
Sam Chammas
Carmaig de Forest
Ken Layne
Douglas Farage
Rick Wilkins
Irene Liberatore
Mike Martt
Pat Craig
 Golden Harmonies by The Pink Expectations: Caren Abrams and Jane Robson
 Sweet Soul Horns by Jim Martone and Leif Cole
 Hammond B-3 organ by Mighty Joe Longa
 Slide guitar by Mike Martt
 Recorded and mixed by Robert Feist
 Assisted by Bryan Rutter, John Kliner, John Kerns and Mark Paladino
 Recorded and mixed at George Tobin Studio, North Hollywood
 Additional recording at The Edge in Los Angeles and Sunswept Studio in Studio City
 Booking: Venture Booking, New York
 Trail Boss: Bullethead
 Photos: $cott Ambrose Reilly
 Mastered at Capitol by Eddy Schreyer
 Art direction by Patrick Pending
 Cover painting by Patrick Dillon

References

1987 albums
Mojo Nixon albums
Skid Roper albums
Enigma Records albums